Holy Trinity is an unincorporated community in Russell County, Alabama, United States. It is about 20 miles south of Columbus, Georgia, on State Route 165 and is the location of Apalachicola Fort Site, a National Historic Landmark.

Features 
The Catholic religious institutes of the Missionary Servants of the Most Holy Trinity (priests and Brothers) and the Missionary Servants of the Most Blessed Trinity (Sisters) were founded in Holy Trinity in 1928. It is also home to Saint Joseph Parish and the Blessed Trinity Shrine, a retreat center.

A post office was located in the community, but it has been closed.

References

Unincorporated communities in Alabama
Unincorporated communities in Russell County, Alabama
Columbus metropolitan area, Georgia
1928 establishments in Alabama